Bahrenfleth is a municipality in the district of Steinburg, in Schleswig-Holstein, Germany. The town was founded in the 14th century.

References

Municipalities in Schleswig-Holstein
Steinburg